Michael Allan Woodhouse (born 1965) is a National member of the New Zealand Parliament.

Early years
Woodhouse was born and raised in South Dunedin, the fifth of nine children. He attended St Patrick's, St Edmund's and St Pauls High School, now Kavanagh College, which he left at the end of sixth form in 1982.

He worked for the National Bank of New Zealand in Dunedin and Wellington until 1987 when he embarked on a rugby sojourn to Scotland and England, playing for Dunfermline 1987/88 and Broughton Park in Manchester 1988/89. He then returned to Dunedin where he studied commerce and accounting at the University of Otago, graduating in 1993.

He worked at Taylor McLachlan Accountants in Dunedin, Dunedin Hospital and ACC. In 2005 he earned a Master of Health Administration degree at the University of New South Wales in Australia.
Before his political career, Woodhouse was the CEO of Mercy Hospital in Dunedin from 2001 to 2008.

Woodhouse was convicted for drink-driving when he was 21 years old.

Member of Parliament

Michael Woodhouse was first elected to Parliament in 2008 as a list MP for the National Party. In each election, he has unsuccessfully contested the electorate that covers central Dunedin: first Dunedin North (2008–2017), and then Dunedin (2020).

Woodhouse served senior roles in the John Key and Bill English-led Fifth National Government, including senior whip, Minister of Immigration, Minister of Transport, Minister of Police and Minister of Revenue.

Fifth National Government, 2008–2017
Woodhouse was selected as National's Dunedin North candidate in 2008, succeeding Katherine Rich who had been a list MP for 9 years but was retiring. The electorate had been held by the Labour Party for all but six years since 1922, and Woodhouse was defeated by the Labour incumbent Pete Hodgson. Despite this loss, due to the National Party's strong result and his position on the party list, Woodhouse was elected as a list MP.

In his first term, Woodhouse served as a member of the Health and Transport & Industrial Relations Select Committees. After the 2011 election, Woodhouse was elected as the National Party's senior whip.

In a reshuffle of the Executive in January 2013, Woodhouse was made a minister outside cabinet and was given the Immigration, Veteran's Affairs and associate transport portfolios. In January 2014, he was promoted into the Cabinet; that October, after the 2014 election, he was assigned the Police portfolio and the new Workplace Relations and Safety portfolio. In 2016 he served as Minister of Revenue and in 2017, under new prime minister Bill English, was Minister for the Accident Compensation Corporation.

As Minister for Workplace Relations and Safety, Woodhouse caused controversy when he released a list of 57 high-risk industries for his Health and Safety Reform Bill in August 2015. This list was mocked by the Opposition because worm farming and mini golf were deemed "high risk", while dairy and cattle farming was not. Labour leader,  Andrew Little, stated the new classifications were "overly complicated, ill-thought-out and rushed through to appease National Party backers, putting the lives of New Zealanders at risk". While Labour's spokesperson for Labour issues, Iain Lees-Galloway, said Woodhouse "can’t worm his way out of this. He will be forever ridiculed as the Minister who made killer worm farms safer but failed to protect people working in some of New Zealand's most dangerous industries".

Woodhouse also led the passage of the Shop Trading Hours Amendment Bill, which devolved to local authorities the power to pass bylaws allowing shops to open on Easter Sunday.

Opposition, 2017–present
Following the formation of a Labour-led coalition government with the support of New Zealand First and the Green Party, National and its former support partner, the libertarian ACT New Zealand party, formed the opposition in the House of Representatives. Michael Woodhouse became Deputy Shadow Leader of the House and the National Party's spokesperson for health and immigration.

In early August 2018, Woodhouse in his capacity as National health spokesperson called for National Health Targets to be a legal requirement in response to the Labour Party's proposed Child Poverty legislation. In late August 2018, Woodhouse objected to United States whistleblower Chelsea Manning's proposed tour of New Zealand in early September 2018, arguing that she should be banned due to her lack of remorse over her role in leaking sensitive US military documents to WikiLeaks.

As Opposition health spokesperson, Woodhouse was a member of the Epidemic Response Committee, a select committee that considered the government's response to the COVID-19 pandemic. On 17 June, Woodhouse claimed that a source had told him that two travellers, who tested positive for COVID-19, had made physical contact with others while travelling from Auckland to Wellington to attend a funeral. In response, the Ministry of Health confirmed that the two infected travellers had "five minutes" of limited contact with two friends during their journey.

On 18 June, Woodhouse alleged that a homeless man had bluffed his way into a two-week stay in a five-star hotel being used as a COVID-19 isolation facility by pretending to have newly returned from overseas. On 23 June, after Director-General of Health Ashley Bloomfield told media that an investigation had found no evidence to support Woodhouse's claims and that the alleged incident was likely to be "an urban myth," Woodhouse responded that he stood by his statements, saying "the absence of any evidence does not mean it did not occur." On 11 August, RNZ reported that official investigations had concluded that a man with no fixed abode had spent time in managed isolation, but had done so after returning from Australia, and hence had been present legitimately.

On 10 July, Woodhouse admitted that he had received private patient information from former National Party President Michelle Boag in late June, which had led to Boag's resignation from the National Party and fellow National MP Hamish Walker being stripped of his portfolios. Woodhouse confirmed that he had deleted the emails, stating that it was inappropriate to have leaked them. Woodhouse was criticised by Health Minister Chris Hipkins, who alleged that he had been "sitting on information" related to the recent COVID-19 leak. Following a leadership election within the National Party that was held on 15 July 2020, Woodhouse was stripped of his health spokesperson portfolio by newly elected leader Judith Collins, who gave the role to Shane Reti.

During the 2020 New Zealand general election held on 17 October, Woodhouse contested the new Dunedin electorate but was defeated again by David Clark, by a final margin of 15,521 votes. Woodhouse was re-elected to Parliament on the party list. After Gerry Brownlee resigned as National Party deputy leader, Stuff reported that Woodhouse was considering running for the position and was "taking soundings", though said that he was "unlikely to run if there is caucus consensus around [Shane] Reti. In the end, Woodhouse did not stand and Reti was elected as deputy leader unopposed on 10 November. The next day, Woodhouse was announced as the party's new finance and transport spokesperson, and Deputy Shadow Leader of the House in Collins' Shadow Cabinet.

In December 2021, following the leadership election of Christopher Luxon, Woodhouse lost the finance portfolio to Simon Bridges.

On 19 January 2023, Woodhouse regained the position of Shadow Leader of the House during a reshuffle of Luxon's shadow cabinet. Woodhouse had previously served as Deputy Shadow Leader under Collins.

Views 
Woodhouse voted against the Marriage (Definition of Marriage) Amendment Bill, a bill allowing same-sex couples to marry in New Zealand. He also opposed the End of Life Choice Bill and the Abortion Legislation Bill. Woodhouse was one of only eight MPs to vote against the Conversion Practices Prohibition Legislation Act 2022 at its final reading in February 2022.

Despite his opposition to the Contraception, Sterilisation, and Abortion (Safe Areas) Amendment Act 2022 on free speech grounds, Woodhouse voted in favour of the bill during its first Parliamentary reading because the public needed to have their say on the proposed legislation at the select committee stage. Woodhouse voted against the bill during its second and third readings.

Personal life
Woodhouse is married to Amanda; the couple has three children.

He is an avid rugby fan, having played for Otago and South Island representative teams in his youth. He has been active in the Parliamentary Sports Trust as a rugby player and referee, having also refereed the game before and during his parliamentary career.

References

External links

Michael Woodhouse at Parliament
Michael Woodhouse at the National Party
Michael Woodhouse – personal website

New Zealand National Party MPs
Politicians from Dunedin
University of Otago alumni
Living people
New Zealand list MPs
People educated at Trinity Catholic College, Dunedin
1965 births
Government ministers of New Zealand
Members of the New Zealand House of Representatives
21st-century New Zealand politicians
Candidates in the 2017 New Zealand general election
Candidates in the 2020 New Zealand general election